Ronnie Coyle (4 August 1964 – 12 April 2011) was a Scottish professional footballer who played as a defender.

Early life
Coyle was born in Glasgow and educated at St. Gerard's Secondary School. Coyle played for Celtic Boys Club and the Scotland Under-15 schoolboy honours team, alongside, among others, Paul McStay, John Robertson and Ally Dick, which defeated England 5–4 in 1980.

Career
Coyle began his professional career as a youngster with Celtic. After just two appearances and a loan period with Clyde, Coyle had a brief spell with Middlesbrough before moving to Rochdale.

After a year with Rochdale, Coyle moved to Kirkcaldy club Raith Rovers in 1988. In his eight years with Rovers, Coyle won two First Division titles and a League Cup, also playing in Raith's only season in Europe. After helping Rovers secure a mid-table finish in the Premier Division, Coyle moved on to Ayr United, where he spent a season before similar spells with Albion Rovers and East Fife. Coyle finished his career with Queen's Park.

Coyle – who moved out of football and worked in sales and marketing back in his native Glasgow – was part of a number of former Raith players who lent his weight to the 'Reclaim the Rovers' campaign, taking part in a fundraising walk in the summer of 2005.

In April 2009 Coyle was diagnosed with a form of leukaemia for which he was admitted to the Beatson West of Scotland Cancer Centre. On 27 March 2011 Raith Rovers hosted a benefit match for him involving their 1994 Coca-Cola Cup winning team and the Celtic runners-up team with Celtic coming out on top 4–2 on penalties after a 3–3 draw. Coyle died just weeks later on 12 April 2011 from the disease he had battled. He was survived by his wife Joan and their three children, Kevin, Briony and Georgia.

Honours
Raith Rovers
 Scottish First Division: 2
 1992–93, 1994–95
 Scottish League Cup: 1
 1994–95

Ayr United
 Scottish Second Division: 1
  1996–97

References

External links
 
 

Scottish footballers
Association football defenders
Celtic F.C. players
Clyde F.C. players
Middlesbrough F.C. players
Rochdale A.F.C. players
Raith Rovers F.C. players
Ayr United F.C. players
Albion Rovers F.C. players
East Fife F.C. players
Queen's Park F.C. players
Scottish Football League players
English Football League players
1964 births
2011 deaths
Deaths from cancer in Scotland
Deaths from leukemia
Footballers from Glasgow